Cornelia Hahn Oberlander  LL.D. (20 June 1921 – 22 May 2021) was a German-born Canadian landscape architect. Her firm, Cornelia Hahn Oberlander Landscape Architects, was founded in 1953, when she moved to Vancouver.

During her career she contributed to the designs of many high-profile buildings in both Canada and the United States, including the Robson Square and the Law Courts Complex in Vancouver, the National Gallery of Canada, the Canadian Chancery in Washington D.C., the Library Square at the Vancouver Public Library, the Museum of Anthropology at the University of British Columbia, and Northwest Territories Legislative Assembly Building in Yellowknife.

Family and early life

Oberlander was born at Muelheim-Ruhr, Germany, the daughter of Beate (Jastrow) and Franz Hahn. She was the niece of educationalist Kurt Hahn, the founder of Schule Schloss Salem in Germany, Gordonstoun in Scotland, and UWC Atlantic College in the UK; as well as the niece of Elisabeth Jastrow, the German-born American classical archaeologist.

A horticulturist who wrote gardening books for children, Beate Hahn fostered in her daughter a deep love and appreciation for nature from a young age. Since she had a garden bed when she was four years old and planted peas and corn, she knew the joy of growing. In an interview with Mechtild Manus, tracing the roots of her interests in landscape architecture, Oberlander stated:"At the age of eleven... I studied a mural in the artist's studio showing the river Rhine and an imaginary town. When I asked the artist about the green spaces in this mural, she told me that these were parks. When I came home, I told my mother 'I want to make parks'. From there all my education was directed towards becoming a landscape architect." 

When Oberlander was 18, being Jewish, her sister, her mother, and she escaped Nazi persecution after the "Kristallnacht" (Night of Broken Glass) pogrom in 1938 by fleeing to England. They emigrated to the United States in 1939.

Her mother had a truck farm in New Hampshire during the war, which Oberlander worked on. She had come to America with the hopes of exploring the professional educational opportunities that involved the creation of parks and green spaces, and pursued that objective in American colleges.

Higher education and later life
In 1944 Oberlander was awarded a BA degree from Smith College and, in 1947, she was among the first class of women awarded degrees in landscape architecture by Harvard. In her interview with Jenny Hall she stated, "When I went to Smith, women who wanted to become landscape architects went to the Cambridge School, a part of Harvard University, because at that time, women could not attend Harvard. But with the war that changed, and in 1943 I was one of the very first women to be admitted to the Harvard Graduate School of Design." She met her future husband, Peter Oberlander at a class picnic. Born in Vienna, he also had fled with his family from the Nazis in 1938. He was awarded a Ph.D. in regional planning from Harvard.

Oberlander began work with Louis Kahn and Oscar Stonorov in Philadelphia and then with landscape architect Dan Kiley in Vermont. She married her husband in 1953. They moved to Vancouver and had three children. Her husband's professional career was as an architect and as Canada's first professor of Urban and Regional Planning.

She founded a small landscape architecture firm in Vancouver. Oberlander then became interested in the modern art movement led by B. C. Binning and Ned Pratt, which combined art and architecture to address the connections between urbanism and surrounding natural settings.

The early years of Oberlander's independent practice were dedicated to designing landscapes for low-income housing projects and playgrounds, the most famous of which is the Canadian Government Pavilion, Children's Creative Centre and play area for Expo 67 in Montreal. Her first playground, for a 1951 public housing project for architect Louis Kahn, included a vegetable garden and a fruit tree. For public housing in Maclean Park, she designed a playground. On Skeena Terrace, on the Lougheed Highway, she included vegetable gardens.

She later practiced on a more commercial scale, working with architects and other professionals from various disciplines to create aesthetic solutions for challenging projects. Before beginning a project she researched it thoroughly to ensure that her innovative schemes would be practical and long-lasting.  Oberlander always approached a project from an environmental standpoint. In her Convocation Address for the acceptance of an honorary degree from Simon Fraser University she stated:
 

Her concern for the environment and for people in general, was further exemplified by her involvement with the Hebrew University of Jerusalem on Mount Scopus. Oberlander and her husband, Peter, visited Israel for a congress with the International Federation of Landscape Architects in 1962. According to the Jewish Independent, the Oberlanders were in Israel to study irrigation systems, but they "fell more deeply in love with the land and its people". The Oberlanders engaged in and spearheaded many activities to benefit the university from 1979 on, including: setting up a Canadian Studies Program, bringing boxes of Canadian textbooks to Israel for donation to the university, developing a botanical garden, working with a team of planners to assist the community of Ashkalon in accommodating settlers from North Africa and Georgia, and advocating for the restoration of historic buildings on the campus. The Oberlanders were honored for their contributions by the Vancouver chapter of Canadian Friends of the Hebrew University of Jerusalem in 2004 and they visited Israel many times in their philanthropic efforts.

Oberlander received the "rare and exceptional honour" of being elected to both the Canadian Society of Landscape Architects' College of Fellows (in 1981) and the American Society of Landscape Architects' Council of Fellows (in 1992).

In 1999–2000, she contributed her expertise to the Vancouver Art Gallery for its "Out of This Century" exhibition, guiding patrons through the selection of visual art pieces that were chosen from the permanent collection of the gallery (by Oberlander and five other Vancouverites) to reflect and represent the city art scene through the decades.

Peter Oberlander died on 27 December 2008.

Death
Cornelia Oberlander died of COVID-19 in Vancouver, British Columbia on 22 May 2021 during the COVID-19 pandemic in British Columbia, one month shy of her 100th birthday.

Awards and honours

 1981, Fellow, Canadian Society of Landscape Architects 
 1990 Member of the Order of Canada 
 1991 Honorary law degree, University of British Columbia
 1992, Fellow, American Society of Landscape Architects
 1992 Commemorative Medal for the 125th Anniversary of the Confederation of Canada
 1995 Allied Medal, Royal Architectural Institute of Canada
 1997 - Granted an honorary membership in the Architectural Institute of British Columbia
 2001 Honorary law degree, Ryerson University
 2002 Honorary law degree, Smith College
 2004 Honoree of Canadian Friends of the Hebrew University of Jerusalem fundraising gala
 2005 Honorary law degree, Simon Fraser University
 2006 - The Canadian Centre for Architecture held an exhibition Cornelia Hahn Oberlander: Ecological Landscapes, which featured material from the Cornelia Hahn Oberlander Archive at the CCA and photographs by Etta Gerdes.
 2008 Honorary law degree, McGill University
 2008 Honorary law degree, Dalhousie University
 2009 Officer of the Order of Canada
 2011 Awarded the Sir Geoffrey Jellicoe Award of the International Federation of Landscape Architects
 2012 Awarded the American Society of Landscape Architects Medal
 2014 Honorary law degree, University of Calgary
 2015 Margolese National Design for Living Prize
 2015 - Included in Chatelaine Magazine's Women of the year: 30 Canadians who rocked 2015 listing.
 2016 Inaugural recipient of the Governor General's Medal in Landscape Architecture
 2016 Member of the Order of British Columbia
 2017 Companion of the Order of Canada
 2017 LAF Medal of the Landscape Architecture Foundation
 2018 - Profiled in the 2018 documentary film, City Dreamers, alongside Phyllis Lambert, Blanche Lemco van Ginkel, and Denise Scott Brown, as women who shaped the world we live in.
 2021 - First award of The Cornelia Hahn Oberlander International Landscape Architecture Prize, created by The Cultural Landscape Foundation (TCLF) to honor the works of Cornelia and her dedication to the profession of Landscape Architecture. Additionally, the TCLF named this prize in Oberlander's name to recognize her efforts to address social, environmental, and ecological issues through her design work. This prize will be awarded every other year. This is the only award in the profession of Landscape Architecture that includes a $100,000.00 prize.

Important works

Oberlander produced landscape designs for private residences, playgrounds, urban parks, and other public spaces, as well as major projects including landscaping for:
 70 playgrounds in Canada and helping to establish the National Task Force on Play
 18th and Bigler Street playground, Philadelphia
 Cherokee Apartments, Philadelphia
 Philadelphia International Airport landscape
 Smith College Master Plan, 1997
 Ottawa City Hall, with Moshe Safdie, 1989-1994
 Vancouver Park Board natural log seating on Vancouver beaches, 1964
 New York Times Building atrium that includes an evergreen carpet of sedges, ferns, and several birch trees with architect Renzo Piano and H M White Site Architects, 2002
 Hebrew University of Jerusalem botanical garden, 2004
 "green rooftop" on the Canadian embassy in Berlin, with Kuwabara Payne McKenna Blumberg Architects, 1999-2005
 C. K. Choi Building for the Institute of Asian Research at UBC, with Matsuzaki Wright Architects, 1996
 Vancouver Public Library, with Moshe Safdie Architects, 1995
 Vancouver General Hospital burn unit garden
 Northwest Territories Legislative Building, Yellowknife, with Matsuzaki/Wright Architects, 1995
 Canadian Chancery in Washington, D.C., with Arthur Erickson Architects, 1989
 National Gallery of Canada in Ottawa, with Moshe Safdie Architects, 1988
 Co-authored Trees in the City, with Ira Bruce Nadel and Lesley R. Bohm, 1977
 Museum of Anthropology at UBC, Vancouver, landscapes including its rear reflection pool, with Arthur Erickson Architects and Stantec Architecture, 1976 and from 2003
 Peacekeeping Monument, Reconciliation, 1992
 Robson Square landscape architecture and stramps and the Law Courts government complex in Vancouver, with Arthur Erickson Architects, 1974–1983 and from 2003
 VanDusen Botanical Garden, with architect Peter Busby, Visitors Center project, with Perkins and Will, 2011

Exhibitions 

 Cornelia Hahn Oberlander: Ecological Landscapes,  Canadian Centre for Architecture, Montreal (2006)
 Canadian Megaform, Canadian Centre for Architecture, Montreal (2014-2015)
New Ways of Living: Jewish Architects in Vancouver 1955-1975 (online), The Jewish Museum and Archives of British Columbia, Vancouver (2016)
Bauhaus (Canada) 101, University of Manitoba School of Art Gallery, Winnipeg (2020)
Cornelia Hahn Oberlander: Genius Loci, Art Gallery of Alberta, Edmonton (2021)

References

Sources
 Susan Herrington. Cornelia Hahn Oberlander: Making the Modern Landscape. Charlottesville: University of Virginia Press, 2014.  
 Charles A. Birnbaum and Stephanie S. Foell.  Shaping the American Landscape: New Profiles from the Pioneers of American Landscape Design Project. Charlottesville: University of Virginia Press, 2009.  .
 Kathy Stinson. Love Every Leaf: The Life of Landscape Architect Cornelia Hahn Oberlander. Toronto: Tundra, 2008. 
 Mechtild Manus, Lisa Rochon. Picturing Landscape Architecture: Projects of Cornelia Hahn Oberlander as seen by Etta Gerdes. Munich: Callwey / Montreal: Goethe-Institute, 2006 
 Oberlander at The Canadian Encyclopedia, 2020
 Katharine Hamer, "A home fit for King David: Architects created a space tailored to Jewish independent school", Jewish Independent, 17 February 2006
 Cornelia Oberlander to present new park design April 1 , City of Toronto, 21 March 2003.
 Waterfall Building Green Roof Case Study, Canada Mortgage and Housing Corporation, January 2002 (pdf)
 Web Atlas Featured Projects | BCSLA British Columbia Society of Landscape Architects new link to BCSLA Web Atlas October 2013
 Library Square Building aerial view
Charles Birnbaum "Oral history of Cornelia Hahn Oberlander" on August 3-5, 2008, Cultural History Project
Announces Oberlander Prize
Vancouver Heritage
  Mehr Grün in die Innenstadt.  Hahn Oberlander visiting the town of her childhood, 2012. Westdeutsche Allgemeine Zeitung, Der Westen, 12 August 2012, by Margitta Ulbricht

Further reading
 Cornelia Hahn Oberlander: Making the Modern Landscape. by Susan Herrington. Charlottesville, University of Virginia Press, Baltimore, Md.: Project MUSE, 2013

External links

Finding aid for the Cornelia Hahn Oberlander Fonds at the Canadian Centre for Architecture (digitized items)

1921 births
2021 deaths
Women landscape architects
American landscape architects
American people of German-Jewish descent
Canadian landscape architects
Canadian people of German-Jewish descent
Canadian architects
People from Mülheim
German emigrants to the United States
German emigrants to Canada
Jewish architects
Smith College alumni
Harvard Graduate School of Design alumni
People from Vancouver
Canadian Jews
Companions of the Order of Canada
Members of the Order of British Columbia
Deaths from the COVID-19 pandemic in Canada